Geophilus bobolianus is a species of soil centipede in the family Geophilidae found in France and Italy. This species has 45 to 51 pairs of legs. It was originally classified as a subspecies of G. longicornis (now G. flavus) identified by its lack of anterior sternal pores.

References

bobolianus